The Jane Rogers Championship was a golf tournament on the Canadian Tour from 2007 to 2010 that was held in the Greater Toronto Area. It was originally hosted at Lakeview Golf Club, Mississauga before moving to Greystone Golf Club, Halton Hills in 2009.

Host courses
2007–08 Lakeview Golf Club, Mississauga, Ontario
2009–10 Greystone Golf Club, Halton Hills, Ontario

Winners
Clublink Jane Rogers Championship
2010  Aaron Goldberg

Roxul Jane Rogers Championship
2009  Ryan Yip

Jane Rogers Championship of Mississauga
2008  Alex Coe
2007  Byron Smith

External links

Coverage on Canadian Tour's official site

Golf tournaments in Ontario
Former PGA Tour Canada events
Recurring sporting events established in 2007
Recurring sporting events disestablished in 2010